The Laser World Championship have been held every year since 1974, organized by the International Sailing Federation.

Laser is an Olympic sailing class.

Editions

Medalists

Multiple medallist

See also
ISAF Sailing World Championships
Men's Laser Radial World Championships
Laser 4.7 World Championships

References

External links
Sailing competitions
World Champs – Laser Standard
Sailing World Championships – Laser from site Sports123.com (by Internet Archive)

Laser World Championships
Recurring sporting events established in 1974